Steven J. Fitzpatrick (born December 2, 1978) is an American politician of the Republican party in the Montana Senate. Before being elected to the Senate, Fitzpatrick served in the Montana House of Representatives for the 20th district from 2011 to 2017.

Personal life
Fitzpatrick was born and raised in Helena, Montana. He earned his bachelor's degree in biology from Montana State University. He then went to law school at Arizona State University. He was a law clerk for Judge Thomas Honzel of the Montana First Judicial District Court.

Fitzpatrick is a lawyer with the law firm of Browning, Kaleczyc, Berry & Hoven, P.C. Fitzpatrick and his wife Julia are the parents of three daughters.

References

1978 births
21st-century American politicians
Living people
Montana State University alumni
Politicians from Helena, Montana
Republican Party members of the Montana House of Representatives
Sandra Day O'Connor College of Law alumni